The 1995 season in the Latvian Higher League, named Virslīga, was the fifth domestic competition since the Baltic nation gained independence from the Soviet Union on 6 September 1991. Tenth teams competed in this edition, with Skonto FC claiming the title.

First round

Match table

Second round

Championship group

Match table

Relegation group

Match table

Top scorers

Awards

Skonto FC 1995

References
RSSSF
Skonto FC 1995

Latvian Higher League seasons
1
Latvia
Latvia